Cleanthony Early (born April 17, 1991) is an American professional basketball player for Dynamo Lebanon of the Lebanese Basketball League. He was an All-American college player at Wichita State University after a stint at Sullivan County Community College.

Early life and high school career
Early was born in The Bronx. After Early's cousin was murdered, his mother decided to leave the city and relocate to suburban Middletown, New York when he was 14. Early attended Pine Bush High School in Pine Bush, New York before transferring to Mount Zion Christian Academy in Durham, North Carolina. Tragedy affected Early once again after his brother drowned in Schoharie Creek at age 32. This led to Early wanting to be closer to his family and attending Sullivan County Community College.

Considered a two-star recruit by ESPN.com, Early was listed as the No. 102 small forward in the nation in 2010.

College career
Early was a junior college star at Sullivan County Community College, where he was the two-time Division III NJCAA Player of the Year.  After considering offers from major conference schools, he signed with Wichita State and coach Gregg Marshall.

Early made an immediate impact for the Shockers, averaging 13.9 points and 5.4 rebounds per game. He was named first team All-Missouri Valley Conference and the MVC Newcomer of the Year.  In the post-season, Early led the team to the 2013 Final Four in Atlanta. In the Shockers' semifinal game against eventual champion Louisville, Early scored 24 points and collected 10 rebounds in a narrow 72–68 loss. He was named to the All-Final Four team for his efforts.

Going into his senior season, Early gained widespread national attention. He was named preseason Player of the Year for the Missouri Valley Conference and was named to the preseason top 50 watch lists for the John Wooden and Naismith Awards for national player of the year.

Early helped lead the 2013–14 team to an undefeated 34–0 record entering the NCAA Tournament, becoming the first team in NCAA Division I men's basketball to do so in over two decades. Cleanthony put up an impressive effort in an attempt to help the Shockers advance to the sweet sixteen, with 31 points and 7 rebounds on 12/17 shooting. The Shockers ended up losing to Kentucky 78–76, ending their hopes of a final four repeat.

Professional career

New York Knicks (2014–16)
On June 26, 2014, Early was selected with the 34th overall pick in the 2014 NBA draft by the New York Knicks. On August 1, 2014, he signed with the Knicks. During his rookie season, he had multiple assignments with the Westchester Knicks of the NBA Development League. In three games for Westchester during the 2014–15 season, he averaged 20.3 points and 9.7 rebounds per game. On March 25, 2015, Early had a season-best game for New York with 18 points and 4 rebounds against the Los Angeles Clippers.

During the 2015–16 season, Early received multiple assignments to Westchester. On December 2, 2015, he became the fifth player ever to appear in both a Development League game and NBA game in the same day. On March 20, 2016, Early made his first appearance for New York since December 29, 2015, having been out for nearly three months with a knee injury he suffered after being shot on December 30.

Early re-signed with the New York Knicks on October 18, 2016, but was waived three days later. On October 31, 2016, Early was acquired by the Westchester Knicks of the NBA Development League as an affiliate player of the New York Knicks.

Santa Cruz Warriors (2016–17)
On December 21, 2016, Early was acquired by the Santa Cruz Warriors in a three-team trade involving Westchester and the Texas Legends. In 16 games for Santa Cruz, he averaged 9.2 points and 3.9 rebounds per game. Early appeared in 19 games for Santa Cruz in the 2017–18 season.

AEK Athens (2017)
On September 2, 2017, Early penned a contract with AEK Athens of the Greek League, but Contract was void due to discrepancy with team

Rio Grande Valley Vipers (2017–2018)
On December 21, 2017, Early was traded by the Warriors with the rights to Elgin Cook to the Rio Grande Valley Vipers for Winston Shepard and the rights to Markus Kennedy.

Atomerőmű SE (2019)
On August 23, 2019, he has signed with Atomerőmű SE of the Hungarian Nemzeti Bajnokság I/A.

Al Ahli (2019–2020)
On October 11, 2019, Early signed with Al Ahli of the Saudi Basketball league.

Antibes Sharks (2020–2021)
On August 6, 2020, he signed a five-year deal with Antibes Sharks of the LNB Pro B. Early was named LNB Pro B player of the week on October 19, after his 41-point, 8-rebound performance against Rouen Métropole Basket.

New Taipei CTBC DEA (2021–2022)
On November 9, 2021, he signed with New Taipei CTBC DEA of the T1 League.

Cape Town Tigers (2022)
On May 4, 2022, Early was announced as a new signing by the Cape Town Tigers of the Basketball Africa League (BAL), joining the team ahead of the 2022 BAL Playoffs. On May 23, Early made his debut and scored 15 points in the quarterfinal against Monastir, in which the Tigers were eliminated.

TaiwanBeer HeroBears (2022)
On November 25, 2022, Early signed with TaiwanBeer HeroBears of the T1 League. On January 5, 2023, TaiwanBeer HeroBears terminated the contract relationship with Early.

NBA career statistics

Regular season

|-
| style="text-align:left;"| 
| style="text-align:left;"| New York
| 39 || 7 || 16.6 || .355 || .262 || .750 || 2.5 || .9 || .6 || .3 || 5.4
|-
| style="text-align:left;"| 
| style="text-align:left;"| New York
| 17 || 2 || 9.1 || .300 || .267 || .750 || 1.5 || .4 || .1 || .2 || 1.8
|- class="sortbottom"
| style="text-align:left;"| Career
| style="text-align:left;"|
| 56 || 9 || 14.3 || .346 || .263 || .750 || 2.2 || .8 || .5 || .3 || 4.3

Personal life
In the early hours of December 30, 2015, Early was held up at gunpoint and shot in the right knee while traveling in an Uber. The attack took place after Early and his girlfriend left a strip club in Maspeth, Queens. He was taken to Elmhurst Hospital after the shooting where he was listed in stable condition.

References

External links

 Wichita State Shockers bio

1991 births
Living people
African-American basketball players
All-American college men's basketball players
American expatriate basketball people in France
American expatriate basketball people in Japan
American expatriate basketball people in Saudi Arabia
American expatriate basketball people in South Africa
American men's basketball players
American shooting survivors
Basketball players from New York City
Cape Town Tigers players
New York Knicks draft picks
New York Knicks players
People from Middletown, Orange County, New York
Rio Grande Valley Vipers players
Santa Cruz Warriors players
Small forwards
Sportspeople from the New York metropolitan area
SUNY Sullivan Generals men's basketball players
Tokyo Hachioji Bee Trains players
Westchester Knicks players
Wichita State Shockers men's basketball players
21st-century African-American sportspeople
American expatriate basketball people in Taiwan
New Taipei CTBC DEA players
T1 League imports
TaiwanBeer HeroBears players